There are many youth hostels in England and Wales.  This article is intended to list all youth hostels operated by the Youth Hostels Association (England & Wales) (YHA), either presently or formerly, and also independent hostels.   The list is split into sections: hostels currently operated by YHA, independent hostels, and others, where others include former hostels previously operated by, or as part of, YHA some time since the creation of YHA in 1931.  The primary sources for these lists are given in the references section.

The locations of hostels having coordinates listed (which should be just the current hostels) may be seen in linked OSM/Google/Bing map.

Current YHA hostels
This section lists the hostels believed to be currently operated by, or as part of, YHA. This section was up-to-date .

Independent hostels
Hostels currently outside the YHA system include:

Other hostels, including former ones
This section lists the locations of former hostels, including all those which have been operated by, or as part of YHA, at some time since 1931.  The majority of the hostels in this section have closed, but there may be some that now operate as independent hostels that are no longer part of YHA (if any of these are identified, they should be moved to the section above).

Footnotes

References

Source material

 The individual YHA Handbooks issued annually between 1931 and 2002 and biennially since 2003.

Tourism in England
Tourism in Wales
Walking in the United Kingdom
Youth